Danielle Dorris (born September 22, 2002) is a Canadian Paralympic swimmer. She won a silver medal in the S7 100m backstroke at the 2020 Summer Paralympics. She won gold in the S7 50m butterfly in a world record time at the 2020 Summer Paralympics.

Recognitions
Dorris was one of twelve recipients of the Senate of Canada’s 2018 Sesquicentennial Medal in the province of New Brunswick, Canada. She received the award for her contributions to Paralympic Swimming and as a mentor to children with disabilities.  The Sesquicentennial medals commemorate the 150th anniversary of the Senate of Canada’s first sitting on November 6, 1857.

In 2021, Sport New Brunswick named Dorris the "Female Athlete of the Year", awarding her the Konika Minolta Sports Award.

References

External links
 
 

2002 births
Living people
Canadian female backstroke swimmers
Canadian female butterfly swimmers
Canadian female medley swimmers
Paralympic swimmers of Canada
Paralympic gold medalists for Canada
Paralympic silver medalists for Canada
Paralympic medalists in swimming
Medalists at the 2020 Summer Paralympics
Swimmers at the 2016 Summer Paralympics
Swimmers at the 2020 Summer Paralympics
Sportspeople from Fredericton
S7-classified Paralympic swimmers
Medalists at the World Para Swimming Championships
21st-century Canadian women